Barbadian singer Rihanna has released 53 singles as lead artist, 17 singles as a featured artist, two charity singles, and four promotional singles. One of the best-selling artists of all time, her albums and singles sales as of 2018 stood at 250 million. In the United States, Rihanna has amassed 14 number-one songs and 32 top-ten songs on the Billboard Hot 100. She has tallied 60 weeks at number one and is the artist with the most weeks in the top ten (360). The Recording Industry Association of America (RIAA) recognized Rihanna as the top-selling female digital singles artist, with 155.5 million certified units .

Rihanna's first chart entry, "Pon de Replay"—the lead single from her debut album Music of the Sun (2005)—peaked at number two in the United States and reached the top ten on the charts of many European countries. From 2006 to 2012, she released one studio album each year (except in 2008), from A Girl like Me to Unapologetic. Each album produced at least one number-one single in the United States. The singles also reached the top five on the charts of Australasia and many European countries. The string of US number-one singles as lead artist includes "SOS" (A Girl like Me, 2006); "Umbrella", "Take a Bow", and "Disturbia" (Good Girl Gone Bad, 2007–2008); "Rude Boy" (Rated R, 2010); "Only Girl (in the World)", "What's My Name", and "S&M" (Loud, 2010); "We Found Love" (Talk That Talk, 2011); and "Diamonds" (Unapologetic, 2012). "Umbrella" spent ten weeks atop the UK Singles Chart, becoming one of the longest chart toppers in UK history.

Rihanna topped the Billboard Hot 100 with three singles as a featured artist: "Live Your Life" with T.I., and "Love the Way You Lie" and "The Monster" with Eminem. Her string of number-one singles marked milestones. With "S&M" topping the chart in April 2011, she registered the shortest time frame to have ten number-one singles (from "SOS" in May 2006) and became the youngest artist (at 23 years) to have ten number-one songs. With "We Found Love" reaching the top ten in October 2011, Rihanna scored the fastest time span to score 20 US top-ten singles (from "Pon de Replay" in June 2005). In the United Kingdom, she is the first female solo artist to have number-one singles in five consecutive years, with "Umbrella", "Take a Bow", "Run This Town" (as a featured artist on Jay-Z's single), "Only Girl (in the World)", and "What's My Name?", from 2007 to 2011.

With "Work", the lead single from her eighth studio album, Anti (2016), Rihanna scored her 14th number-one single on the Billboard Hot 100. This made Rihanna the only artist to have seven consecutive albums each score a number-one single on the Hot 100. "Work" topped the charts in Canada and France, and with 32.5 million digital units based on sales and streaming as of January 2021, became one of the best-selling digital singles of all time. With eight songs from the album reaching number one on the Billboard Hot Dance Club Songs, Rihanna claimed the record for the most number-one songs from a single album. She also scored international chart toppers as a guest vocalist on Calvin Harris's "This Is What You Came For", which reached number one in Australia, Canada and Ireland, and DJ Khaled's "Wild Thoughts", which reached number one in the United Kingdom.

As lead artist

2000s

2010s

2020s

As featured artist

Charity singles

Promotional singles

Other charted and certified songs

See also

List of artists who have achieved simultaneous UK and US number-one hits
List of artists who have achieved simultaneous number-one single and album in the United States
List of artists who reached number one on the UK Singles Chart
List of artists who reached number one on the U.S. Dance Club Songs chart
List of artists who reached number one in the United States

Notes

References

External links

 Official website
 Rihanna at AllMusic
 
 

Discographies of Barbadian artists
Pop music discographies
Rhythm and blues discographies
Discography